West Medford station is an MBTA Commuter Rail station in Medford, Massachusetts. It serves the Lowell Line, and is located at West Medford Square.

History

When the original Boston and Lowell Railroad (B&L) was laid out in the 1830s, West Medford was mostly farmland.  The route of the new railroad (one of the oldest railroads in North America) was built on land acquired from Peter Chardon Brooks, who sold a strip for the right-of-way plus a parcel for the station on High Street. Medford Gates station was open by 1838. The name reflected the large gates built to warn passerby about the grade crossing. The Boston and Maine Railroad (B&M) opened its Medford branch to Medford Square in 1847; the B&L station was renamed West Medford in the early 1850s. A new station building was constructed in 1854.

Elimination of the High Street crossing was considered in 1932, but not implemented. The depot structure, built in 1886, was demolished in the 1960s. The decorative weathervane from the roof of the station was acquired by the Henry Ford Museum in Dearborn, Michigan in the 1950s.

In 2019, the MBTA listed West Medford as a "Tier I" accessibility priority.

References

External links

 MBTA - West Medford
 City of Medford - West Medford Train Station
 Station from High Street from Google Maps Street View

Stations along Boston and Maine Railroad lines
MBTA Commuter Rail stations in Middlesex County, Massachusetts
Buildings and structures in Medford, Massachusetts
Railway stations in Medford, Massachusetts